Catherine Elizabeth Deeley (born 23 October 1976) is an English television presenter and actress. She hosted the ITV children's show SMTV Live (1998–2002), for which she won a BAFTA Children's Award, and its spin-off chart show CD:UK (1998–2005). In 2003, she hosted the talent competition show Fame Academy on BBC One, and became the presenter of the ITV talent show Stars in Their Eyes, hosting until 2005. Since 2006, Deeley has been the host of So You Think You Can Dance in the United States, for which she has been nominated five times for a Primetime Emmy. She played the role of Camomile White in the American supernatural comedy series Deadbeat (2014–2015).

Since 2003, Deeley has been a patron of London's Great Ormond Street Hospital for sick children. In December 2009, she was made a UNICEF UK ambassador.

Early life
Deeley was born on 23 October 1976 at Sandwell General Hospital in West Bromwich, West Midlands, and grew up in Birmingham in nearby Sutton Coldfield and Great Barr. She attended Grove Vale Junior School and Dartmouth High School in Great Barr, where she played the clarinet in the Sandwell Youth Concert Band. She then joined Bishop Vesey's Grammar School in Sutton Coldfield.

Career
At age 14, Deeley entered a regional edition of a BBC competition for The Clothes Show, in which she reached the national finals. She was signed as a model under her nickname of "Cat" to make it easier for clients to re-book her. She left full-time fashion modelling in 1997, following changes in her contract with Storm. She moved on to co-present the MTV chart show, Hitlist UK, with close friend Edith Bowman. From 1998 until 2002, she was co-host with Ant & Dec of the Saturday morning children's programme SM:TV Live and hosted its spin-off programmes CD:UK (1998–2005) and CD:UK Hotshots. On SM:TV Live she often acted as an apparently slightly unwilling assistant whenever the show featured a guest appearance by a magician, participating in a number of different illusions including being sawn in half in a version of the illusion called Clearly Impossible.

In 2001, she won a Children's BAFTA award and appeared in an episode of the BBC's Happiness. In 2002, Deeley appeared in a television advert for Marks and Spencer. Other programmes she hosted include The Record of the Year, Fame Academy, The 2004 Brit Awards and Stars in Their Eyes, as well as a weekly broadcast on London's Capital FM and BBC Choice series Roadtripping, both with former MTV colleague Edith Bowman. In March 2003, it was announced that Deeley would take over from Matthew Kelly as host of the kids series of Stars in Their Eyes. Following Kelly's departure from the main series in March 2004, Deeley became host of the main show until its demise in December 2006.

In 2003, Deeley interviewed Kylie Minogue for a television special about her one-off concert, Money Can't Buy, which was broadcast in the United Kingdom on ITV on 22 November and in Australia on Network Ten on 24 November. In 2005 she played herself in an episode of Little Britain, provided the voice of "Loretta Geargrinder" in the UK version of the film Robots replacing Natasha Lyonne, and presented a countdown of ITV's 50 Greatest Shows alongside Phillip Schofield as part of ITV 50.

In 2006, she began hosting the second season of American reality show So You Think You Can Dance, replacing newsreader Lauren Sánchez, who was pregnant. Deeley again interviewed Kylie Minogue for another television special which was broadcast in the United Kingdom on Sky One on 16 July, in Australia on Channel Nine on 17 July, and BBC America on 9 September. Deeley was a guest reporter on NBC's The Tonight Show. She presented Fox's New Year's Eve Special from Times Square in 2006 and 2007.

On 1 July 2007, Deeley was one of many presenters at the Concert for Diana, a tribute concert to the late Princess Diana, with proceeds from the concert going to Diana's charities, as well as to charities of which her sons Princes William and Harry are patrons. The event, watched by an estimated 500 million people, was held at Wembley Stadium. In September 2007, Deeley presented Soundtrack to My Life, a music series produced by Hamma & Glamma Productions for ITV London that looks at the work and influences of an eclectic band of musicians. In January 2006, a new season of So You Think You Can Dance started its auditions, with Deeley in the role of host. She has been the host of the show ever since. In 2011, Deeley was nominated for a Primetime Emmy Award for Outstanding Host for a Reality or Reality-Competition Programme.

Other projects of Deeley's include presenting the third season of Soundtrack to My Life and playing herself as host of comedian Peter Kay's Britain's Got the Pop Factor. In 2009, Deeley guest hosted the United States syndicated version of Who Wants to Be a Millionaire (for Meredith Vieira), and appearing on BBC America's broadcast of Gordon Ramsay's F Word. In the same year, Deeley hosted the television version of the electronic game 20Q for GSN. In January and February 2010, Deeley hosted So You Think You Can Dance in the UK. Also, in February 2010, she filled in for a holidaying Vieira as host on the morning TV show Today. On 31 March 2010, Deeley filled in for Kelly Ripa on the morning talk show Live with Regis and Kelly.

On 9 January 2011, Deeley made a small guest appearance in the Disney Channel sitcom Shake It Up, where she portrayed a vice principal who is, in secret, a dancer and a host.

In April 2011, Deeley presented an episode of CNN's Icon and chatted to The Simpsons voice actress Nancy Cartwright. In the same month, she also contributed to the network's coverage of that year's Royal Wedding which was hosted by tabloid journalist Piers Morgan.

In June 2011, Deeley launched her own "behind-the-scenes" web series called In the Dressing Room with Cat Deeley, produced by Deeley, Yahoo! and Collective Digital Studio.

On 18 August 2011, she appeared on Live with Regis and Kelly, as a fill-in for Kelly.

On 26 January 2012, she again co-hosted Live with Regis and Kelly with Kelly Ripa. On 14 March 2012, she appeared as a guest judge on America's Next Top Model Cycle 18.

She hosted Fox's celebrity dating game show The Choice, which premiered on 7 June 2012 and ended on 12 July 2012 in the United States.

In 2011, Deeley presented the series Royally Mad for BBC America, and in 2012, she presented the launch show for ITV's Soccer Aid appeal on the Friday before the Soccer Aid match. In June 2014, she once again presented the launch show for Soccer Aid that year.

From 2014 until 2016, Deeley appeared as a panelist on the syndicated game show Celebrity Name Game hosted by Craig Ferguson.

In 2017, Deeley played Maskface in Ant & Dec's Saturday Night Takeaway miniseries The Missing Crown Jewels.

On 31 May 2017, Deeley presented the game show Big Star Little Star, based on the British game show Big Star's Little Star, for the USA Network in the United States.

In October 2017, Deeley began presenting the talent contest Sing: Ultimate A Cappella for Sky One in the United Kingdom.

In 2018, Deeley appeared on The Final Table Season 1 Episode 3, as a guest judge.

A reunion show for SMTV Live, where Deeley and Ant and Dec went back to where the original show was filmed and producers rebuilt the old set. It aired on 26 December 2020 as The Story of SM:TV Live. 

In January 2021, Deeley made her BBC Radio 2 debut sitting in on The Saturday Show. She has regularly provided cover, sitting in for presenters including Steve Wright and Rylan Clark.

She reunited with her Chums cast mates Ant and Dec for a television special on the fifth episode of series seventeen of Ant and Dec's Saturday Night Takeaway on 20 March 2021 which reenacts and picks up the cliffhanger from the wedding episode 20 years ago. 

In April 2021, Deeley presented Lorraine as a guest host over the Easter holidays, joining again for the May spring bank holiday broadcast.

Deeley's first book, a picture book for children titled The Joy in You, was published by Random House on 15 September 2020. It is co-written with Laura Baker and illustrated by Rosie Butcher. A Kirkus review of the book concluded "The message is wholehearted and positive, but the cloying execution doesn't stand out."

As an actress, Deeley appeared as herself in the sixth episode of Life's Too Short. She also appeared in the second episode of House of Lies as herself in January 2012. Her breakthrough as a lead actress came in the 2015 Hulu TV series Deadbeat, playing a celebrity medium named Camomile White. Also in 2015, Deeley voiced a version of herself in an episode of The Simpsons entitled "Waiting for Duffman".

Philanthrophy
Since 2003, Deeley has been a patron of London's Great Ormond Street Hospital. She is also an active supporter of UNICEF. In 2007, she took part in a UNICEF benefit show in Los Angeles during which magician David Copperfield sawed her in half using his antique Buzz Saw illusion. In 2008, she visited a number of UNICEF projects in the Philippines, including their Soccer Aid 2 project in Manila. In December 2009, she was made a UNICEF UK ambassador.

Personal life
Deeley describes her religious affiliation as Anglican, although she was not christened.

Deeley was married to businessman Mark Whelan for five years, divorcing in 2006.

Deeley married comedian and television presenter Patrick Kielty on 30 September 2012 in Rome. They have two children.

During her first few years hosting So You Think You Can Dance, Deeley was described as "an approachable sex symbol" in a Los Angeles Times article published on 4 July 2010.

Filmography

Television

Film

References

External links

 
 

1976 births
20th-century Anglo-Irish people
Actresses from the West Midlands (county)
British children's television presenters
English people of Irish descent
English female models
English radio personalities
BBC Radio 2 presenters
English Anglicans
English television presenters
English game show hosts
Living people
People educated at Bishop Vesey's Grammar School
People from Sutton Coldfield
People from West Bromwich
People from Great Barr
21st-century Anglo-Irish people